= Hendries =

American company based in Milton, Massachusetts

Hendries was an American company based in Milton, Massachusetts, that produced ice cream and popsicles under the Hendrie's brand name. Popsicles have been produced in various flavors since the 1940s. The "traditional" flavors included grape, cherry and orange. Other popsicle package varieties include Citrus Stix (orange, lime, and raspberry), Fudge Stix, and Kids' Carnival Stix, which feature a wide variety of flavors including, but not limited to, grape, root beer, cotton candy, and bubble gum.

Hendries ran a chain of ice cream shops named Hendrie's Ice Cream Shoppes, Inc.

The Hendries factory building was demolished in 2018 to make way for a new mixed-use development. The demolition effort required the MBTA to shut down the Mattapan trolley for 7 days since the brick building shadowed the train tracks and Central Avenue Station.
